John Paul Tate (January 1915 – 19 March 1979) was an Australian actor, active in radio and screen.

Biography
Born in Sydney he was the father of actor Nick Tate and was married to actress and stage manager Neva Carr Glynn. He divorced Glynn in 1954.

After starting his career in vaudeville, he was best known for appearing in On the Beach (1959). He moved to England where he lived the rest of his life.

Filmography

References

External links

20th-century Australian male actors
1915 births
1979 deaths
Australian emigrants to the United Kingdom